Ali Bongo can mean:

 Ali Bongo Ondimba, the president of Gabon from 2009
 William Oliver Wallace (1929–2009), magician, better known as Ali Bongo